Betsy and Chris, Elizabeth Wagner (born September 4, 1952) and Christine Rolseth (June 25, 1952-February 16, 2021), were a folk music duo from Hawaii and Idaho respectively who sang in the Japanese language, and had a string of hits in Japan from 1969 to 1972. They originally came to Japan as members of The Sound of Young Hawaii in 1969.

Hedwig von Trapp was Elizabeth Wagner's singing teacher.

Christine Rolseth died on February 16, 2021, from a kidney disease associated with diabetes.

Singles
 White is the colour of lovers (:jp: 白い色は恋人の色 ) 1 Oct 1969 #2 on the Orion Charts.
 Like a Flower (花のように) 10 Feb 1970 #9 on the Orion Charts.
 It's Summer, and you ... (夏よおまえは) 1 June 1970 #18 on the Orion Charts.
 My Daughter wore Flowers (娘は花をまとっていた) July 1970 #96 on the Orion Charts.

External links
 

American folk musical groups
American girl groups
American musical duos
American expatriates in Japan
Musical groups established in 1969